Gene Saks (born Jean Michael Saks; November 8, 1921 – March 28, 2015) was an American director and actor.  An inductee of the American Theater Hall of Fame, his acting career began with a Broadway debut in 1949.  As a director, he was nominated for seven Tony Awards, winning three for his direction of I Love My Wife, Brighton Beach Memoirs and Biloxi Blues.  He also directed a number of films during his career.  He was married to Bea Arthur from 1950 until 1978, and subsequently to Keren Saks from 1980 to his death in 2015.

Early life
Saks was born in New York City, the son of Beatrix (née Lewkowitz) and Morris J. Saks. Saks first became involved in theater as a student at Hackensack High School. He studied at Cornell University. Upon graduation, he served in the United States Navy during World War II, taking part in the Normandy landings. He also trained for acting at the Dramatic Workshop of The New School in New York with the German director Erwin Piscator and helped start a theater cooperative at the Cherry Lane Theater and appeared in a number of productions as Off Broadway blossomed.

Career
Saks made his acting debut on Broadway in South Pacific in 1949. On stage he also appeared in e. e. cummings's Him, A Shot in the Dark, The Tenth Man and A Thousand Clowns, in the role of Leo "Chuckles The Chipmunk" Herman, which he reprised in the film version. He portrayed Jack Lemmon's brother in the screen adaptation of Simon's The Prisoner of Second Avenue, and also appeared in Nobody's Fool starring Paul Newman.

Saks shared a long-term professional association with playwright/comedy writer Neil Simon, directing Simon's plays Biloxi Blues, Brighton Beach Memoirs, Jake's Women, Rumors, Lost in Yonkers, Broadway Bound, The Odd Couple (1985 revival with female cast) and California Suite. His additional Broadway credits included Enter Laughing; Half a Sixpence; Nobody Loves an Albatross; Mame; I Love My Wife; Same Time, Next Year and Rags.

Among Saks's film directing credits were Barefoot in the Park, The Odd Couple, Cactus Flower (which won Goldie Hawn the Academy Award for Best Supporting Actress), Last of the Red Hot Lovers, Mame, Brighton Beach Memoirs, A Fine Romance, and the 1995 television production of Bye Bye Birdie.

Personal life
Saks was married to fellow Actors Studio member actress Bea Arthur from 1950 until 1978. The couple had two sons by adoption: Matthew (born in 1961), an actor, and Daniel (born in 1964), a set designer. He also had a daughter by his second wife Keren Saks. Saks died of pneumonia at his East Hampton residence on March 28, 2015, aged 93.

Filmography

Film
Director

Actor

Television

Theatre 
As an Actor

As a Director

Awards and nominations
 Tony Awards 

Drama Desk Awards

 1969 DGA Award for Outstanding Directorial Achievement in a Movie – The Odd Couple - Nom
 1991 Outer Critics Circle for Outstanding Direction of a Play - ''Lost in Yonkers - Won

Honours
 Inducted into the American Theater Hall of Fame in 1991.

References

External links
 
 
 Gene Saks at the University of Wisconsin's Actors Studio audio collection

1921 births
2015 deaths
Male actors from New York City
American male film actors
American male stage actors
American theatre directors
Broadway theatre directors
Comedy film directors
Cornell University alumni
Hackensack High School alumni
Deaths from pneumonia in New York (state)
Film directors from New York City
Jewish American male actors
The New School alumni
Tony Award winners
United States Navy personnel of World War II
Military personnel from New York City
21st-century American Jews